Jiamusi Airport may refer to:

 Jiansanjiang Shidi Airport, located in Jiansanjiang
 Fuyuan Dongji Airport, located in Fuyuan